A number of steamships were named Angra, including:

, a coaster in service in 1919
, a cargo ship in service 1928–33
, a tanker in service 1938–42

Ship names